Heo Se-uk (1953–2007) was a 54-year-old South Korean labor union member and taxi driver who set himself ablaze on April 1, 2007 in Seoul to protest the U.S.-Korea Free Trade Agreement. He lived for two weeks after the incident, despite serious burns on 63% of his body. He finally succumbed to a septic infection on April 15.

See also
Self-immolation

References

External links 
 China Daily article
 Announcement and suicide note/will
 Photo: Warning! Extremely graphic content
 Tribute and obituary

1953 births
2007 suicides
Suicides by self-immolation in South Korea
Anti-Americanism
South Korea–United States relations
South Korean taxi drivers
South Korean trade union leaders
People from Gyeonggi Province